Gull-wing, gull wing or gullwing may refer to:
 A wing of a gull

Geography
 Gullwing lake, a freshwater lake near Dryden, Ontario

Designs resembling gull-wings
 Gull wing, an aircraft wing configuration
 Gull-wing door, a car door that is hinged at the roof
 Gull wing, a format for leads of a Small Outline Integrated Circuit
 Mercedes-Benz 300 SL Gullwing car
 Gull Wing Bridge, a lifting bridge in Lowestoft, England

Medicine
 Gull-wing deformity of erosive osteoarthritis